Glenn Earl Trowbridge (born September 22, 1943) is an American politician. He served as a Republican member of the Nevada Assembly from 2014 until 2016.

Early life
Trowbridge was born on September 22, 1943 in Charleston, West Virginia.

Trowbridge graduated from San Diego State University, where he received a bachelor of science in psychology. He received a master in business administration from the National University.

Career
Between 1979 and 2001, Trowbridge was director of human resources for Clark County, Nevada, followed by director of its parks and recreation department. He later worked for Safe Nest, a non-profit organization which helps victims of domestic violence.

Trowbridge served as a Republican member of the Nevada Assembly. He was appointed to this position due to the vacancy left by Wesley Duncan. He is a member of the National Rifle Association (NRA).

Electoral history
Trowbridge ran for office at least two times before his appointment to the Assembly. He was the Republican nominee for Assembly seat 20 back in 1982. He lost to Democratic incumbent Robert G. Craddock by a margin of 54-43%. He also ran for Las Vegas City Council in 2009, narrowly losing to Stavros Anthony 50.08-49.92%. In the June 16 primary, Trowbridge lost to businessman Jim Marchant by a margin of 62.5-37.5%. His loss attributed to his support of a state commerce tax that was proposed and signed into law by Nevada Governor Brian Sandoval.

Personal life
Trowbridge married Patricia Lynn Hill. They have a son, Thomas. They reside in Las Vegas, Nevada.

References

Living people
1943 births
Politicians from Charleston, West Virginia
Politicians from Las Vegas
San Diego State University alumni
National University (California) alumni
Republican Party members of the Nevada Assembly
21st-century American politicians